The twenty-first season of the Dutch TV series Wie is de Mol? ("Who is the Mole?") aired on 2 January 2021. This was the fourth season with Rik van de Westelaken as host. The location of the season was the Czech Republic. The candidates and the location were announced on 21 December 2020 in a special television episode of the aftershow Moltalk.

The season premiered on 2 January 2021. With the socially distanced Live Reunion on 6 March 2021, which saw Roxanne "Rocky" Hehakaija win based on time against fellow finalist, Charlotte Nijs, to successfully unmask actress Renée Fokker as the Mole of 2021. Fokker's reign as the Mole saw Hehakaija win the new all-time lowest pot of €9,675, surpassing the record set by the Season 19 Mole of €10,150.

Format
Followed the same format as its Belgian predecessor, ten candidates were gathered to complete Assignments to earn money for the group pot. However, one of the ten is the titular Mole (de Mol), the one designated to sabotage the assignments and cause the group to earn the least amount of money for the winner's pot as possible. Every few days, players would take a 20-question multiple choice test about the identity of the Mole. Once the test is complete, the candidates await their results in an Execution ceremony. The candidate with the worst score is executed from the game, while in the event of the tie the candidate who completed their test the slowest is executed. The season plays out until there are three remaining candidates, where they must complete a final test (consisting of 40 questions). The candidate with the highest score, or who had completed their test the fastest in a tie, is declared the winner and receives the group's pot.

Candidates

Candidate progress 
The order in which the candidates learned their results are indicated in the table below.

  The candidate saw a Green Screen to proceed to the next episode.
 The candidate used Jokers for this test, and saw a Green Screen to proceed to the next episode.
 The candidate used Jokers for this test, however, they did not see a Green Screen before the executed player saw their Red Screen. Thus they proceeded to the next episode.
 The candidate did not see a Green Screen before the executed player saw their Red Screen. Thus they proceeded to the next episode.
 The candidate received an exemption to automatically proceed to the next episode.
 The candidate was executed from the game and sent home.

Episodes 
For more information, see: List of seasons of "Wie is de Mol?" (in Dutch)

Notes

Season summary

Episode 1 – Gelijk 

Each candidate begins in a room with an envelope and photos of the other candidates and how they would behave as the Mole. The envelope instructs them to find €250 hidden in the room. When they find the money, the Mole slides them an envelope under the door with an offer. They can either keep the €250 they found, or slide the money under the door in exchange for  [one joker]. Unbeknownst to candidates, the Joker they receive after returning the money is in the form of a valueless Joker card.

When the group met for the first time, Rik revealed seven contestants took the Mole’s offer, forfeiting the money found. Rik then gave the three candidates who kept their €250 the same offer, however this time in exchange for a real Joker.  All three candidates accepted the offer.

No money was earned for the pot.

Candidates participate in a Laser game to earn money spread across the courtyard within the Monastery of Jaroslavice, however, there are opponents that can eliminate candidates and vice versa. Any candidate who is hit is out of the game and lose everything they find during the assignment. There is a 30-minute time limit. To win money, candidates must open chests marked with a letter; elsewhere in the field is a sign with the letter and the combination to open the lock and get the money inside. Mid-way through the game, Rik announces that candidates may shoot each other, the last candidate remaining wins an exemption. The group decided not to shoot each other, dismissing the exemption.

€450 was earned for the pot.

The group is separated into five duos; each duo must complete part of a  trip. As the first duo rides, they must remember facts about other candidates written on signs along the track. At the transfer point, they verbally transfer the information to the second duo who rides the next part of the trip, is given more information to remember, and transfers the information to the third duo. The process continues until the fifth duo reach the end of the course and must answer ten yes/no questions based on the information they are provided. Each correct answer earns €100 for the pot and there is a one-hour time limit for the assignment.

€900 was earned for the pot.

Episode 2 –  

'Om de tuin leiden'
The candidates are divided into two groups and are given a tour of either the interior or the garden of Valtice Castle. The group must document information during the tour: through writing, photography and filming. Before the assignment begins, each group chooses a coordinator, who enters a control room to tell their respective groups what to look for. However, when the coordinators arrive in the control room, they are given a secret mission. They must get the writers and photographers in their group to complete secret assignments worth €100 each (communicating to them via earpiece), without the knowledge of the person filming. At the end of the assignment, if the person filming can name two assignments, they earn a Joker and forfeit any money earned by their group.

€900 was earned for the pot.

Candidates are divided into two groups, explorers and gatherers.  The explorers enter Louka Monastery first and take notes on the location of money inside for the gatherers to later collect, communicating via walkie-talkie. Inside the buildings are "Black-light Ballerinas", blindfolded ballerinas who can eliminate candidates by shooting them with a laser gun. Candidates who are shot lose everything they collected, including any hidden Jokers found inside the monastery.  In front of each ballerina are three ballerina boxes, two of which play music when opened and the third contains money. The explorers have 20 minutes, and to help, hints are written on the wall of the monastery.

€400 was earned for the pot.

Candidates arrive at a Tatra truck centre and divide themselves into four duos and one individual, who acts as a ‘communicator’. Two duos must ride a truck as it drives down a bumpy track, and photograph the marked correct signs with symbols on them. They send their photos to the communicator who describes the sign to one of the remaining two duos, who then drive a truck and knock over a corresponding sign at the testing centre. Each correct sign knocked over earns €350 for the pot.

€700 was earned for the pot.

Episode 3 – Vanaf hangen 

Candidates are divided into four duos and locked in a hotel room. Each candidate is given a confidential document with their answers to the previous test. To escape their hotel room, they must enter the correct code word to unlock the door. To receive clues to the code word  ('twenty-one'), the contestants are asked questions about their answers on the previous test. If both candidates in the duo answer truthfully, they receive a hint to the code word. However, each candidate’s answers are visible to the whole group. There are five questions and after each question, teams who receive a hint can attempt to enter the codeword. For each duo that escapes their room, €500 is added to the pot, and the first duo to escape also earns two Jokers each.

€1,000 was earned for the pot.

Candidates divide themselves into duos; one candidate in the duo kayaks and the other without a fear of heights. The four candidates who want to kayak enters a kayak and paddles through the Punkva Caves to find projections. The projections show money and Jokers, with each item having a corresponding Czech word that they memorise to later communicate the information to their partner.

The four candidates who did not participate in the previous assignment are taken to the top of Baťa's Skyscraper, and must abseil down. Along the way, there are five tubes with various contents inside labelled with Czech words corresponding to the words seen by their partner in the cave. As they abseil, they can communicate to their partner and must collect two tubes, one for them and one for their partner. Prior to the abseil, Rik gives the four who abseil an offer; if all four candidates go for the money, then all four win an exemption and forfeit the money. The exemptions were ultimately not awarded.

€2,000 was earned for the pot.

Episode 4 – Voor het zeggen 

Three candidates begin on different floors of the former Baťa's Shoe Factory (now Baťa's Skyscraper), where they must ask questions and record the answers given by the remaining candidates. The remaining four candidates ride a paternoster lift and answer as the lift passes the floor, the time-limit is 20 minutes. The questions require the candidates in the lift to state a required number of possible answers for a category, beginning with a specific letter. For example, 'three clothing items beginning with j'. Each answer is worth €5 and if all required answers for a category are given, €50 is earned for the question.

€1,145 was earned for the pot.

Five candidates are assigned to individually explore Brno and take seven black-and-white photographs in landscape mode, one representing each candidate. There is a 30-minute time-limit for this part of the assignment. The photos may not contain any people, names or references to candidate’s jobs. The photos are then compiled into an exhibit, where the remaining two candidates must guess which candidate each collection of photos belong to. For each correct guess, €200 is earned for the pot. The two candidates are given one free photo to begin with from each candidate's album and each additional photo flipped over reduces the total by €50, while incorrect guesses lose €250.

€1,200 was earned for the pot.

Candidates swim through a lake in Velká Amerika towards a large raft to collect keys from underneath the raft. The keys unlock the ropes attached to the raft to be untangled, as well as a smaller raft. They must light a torch and transfer the burning torch to the larger raft, to ignite a second torch attached to the raft. They must then pull the ropes to steer the raft and burn hanging ropes to release tubes, which are to be collected and returned to shore to be counted. Each tube either adds or loses money for the pot, underneath the larger raft is a map detailing the position and contents of each tube. There is a 45-minute time limit for the assignment.

€2,000 was earned for the pot.

Episode 5 – Tot drie tellen 

The group is divided into three duos, each duo starts at a viewing point at Bohemian Paradise. Two duos begin cards listing a person and action while one duo has location cards. The duos with the person and action cards must paint the person and action listed, to be viewed from afar by the duo with the location card. The duo with the location card must recreate the painting and add the listed place to the painting, before showing the final duo who must guess the person, action and location. The two groups with the person and action cards alternate between painting and guessing, and each guess is to be written next to an amount of money that they win if the sentence is correct.

No money was earned for the pot.

Each candidate individually meets with Rik at the East Bohemian Museum and can place a bid (with money from the pot) to receive information about the upcoming assignment, where three exemptions can be won. The candidate who places the highest bid is given access to the information and can select two other candidates to join them to form a team, while the remaining three candidates form the opposing team. Charlotte, Marije and Rocky all bid €5,000 for the information meaning that, rather than letting the highest bidder pick two others, they automatically form the team that receives the information for the next assignment.

€5,000 was removed from the pot.

Before the assignment begins, each candidate sits the execution test.

One team enters the front wagon of a train and the other team enters the back. They must complete tasks in each wagon to advance to the next carriage as the train travels to the execution ceremony. In the first wagon, teams must find the total price of four tickets that make a train connection between Molsberg and Prague. In the second carriage, teams must identify seven (out of 15) incorrect clocks and solve the riddles attached to them using the information in the wagon. In the third wagon, teams must collect postbags at the two stations as the train passes, and enter the code found inside to unlock the door and reach the centre wagon. Additionally, there is a money clock which begins at €1,800 and depreciates as they complete their tasks. Once a team reaches the center carriage, the clock stops and the money is earned, while the team also wins three exemptions – if the assignment is completed in under 30 minutes.

€850 was earned for the pot. Immediately after the train stops, the execution commences, where the candidate with the lowest score from the remaining three candidates is eliminated.

Episode 6 – Wegstoppen 

The group begins on a bus as it drives down a road with nine stops. At each stop, only one candidate may get off the bus and view the sign behind the stop. The sign either contains a dilemma, information about the stops, or instructs the candidate to remain at the stop for the remainder of the assignment. There are also opportunities to earn advantages and money throughout the assignment at certain bus stops. For each candidate still on the bus after all nine stops, €250 is added to the pot.

€650 was earned for the pot.

Each candidate begins locked in a cell within Prison Mladá Boleslav. Each cell is located in one of three sections; two sections contain two candidates and the third section contains one candidate. Similar to an escape room, they must first escape their individual cell using provided items. They must then cooperate to obtain keys to unlock the gates to escape their section and ultimately the prison. During the assignment, they can find up to €1,500 around the facility, however, this money is only added to the pot if all five candidates escape the prison within the time limit.

No money was earned for the pot.

Candidates begin in different starting positions within Mayrau Open Air Museum, with a unique five-digit code attached to their body. Around the area are eight stations; each station presents candidates with a choice: remove one life from another candidate of their choice, or add €250 to the pot. Candidates are eliminated if they lose three lives, or have their code seen and entered into a tablet by another candidate. The last candidate remaining will not see their screen at the next execution, and selects two other candidates to also not see their screen, if over €500 is earned.

€750 was earned for the pot.  Renée was the last candidate remaining and earned the ability to select two additional candidates not to see their screen at the execution.

Episode 7 – Aanwijzing 

Three candidates enter the mine of Mayrau Open Air Museum and break stones to obtain placards, revealing number codes, which they must communicate to the remaining two candidates via a walkie-talkie. The remaining two candidates are given access to both the locker room and a large hall full of low-hanging garments. Using the codes given, they must find the code on a corresponding locker, which contains a garment inside. Once found, they must enter the hall and hoist all the identical garments to the ones they find in the lockers. There is a 45-minute time limit for the assignment. For each correct garment left hanging low, €25 is added to the pot, however, for each incorrect garment not hoisted, €10 is lost.

€380 was earned for the pot.

Candidates must search around an empty industrial estate, where there are 50 chests scattered around the area. They must load chests into a Jeep and transport them to a designated area to form five Dutch sentences using the words printed on them. Candidates do not need to collect all 50 chests, however, they must use each chest they collect. For each sentence, there are also two pre-assigned chests which must be used in the sentence, and each sentence can have a maximum of 12 words. Sentences do not need to be factual, however they must be grammatically correct. There is a 30-minute time limit for the assignment. For each satisfactory sentence formed, €300 is added to the pot.

€300 was earned for the pot.

Three players begin wearing wireless headphones which play a song. They are separated from each other with dividers and must communicate the song to the remaining two candidates, using only movements. Any mouthing of lyrics or humming is not allowed. The remaining two candidates must guess the name of the song within one minute. After five songs, players rotate positions and the process continues until all 20 songs have been played.  For each correct guess, €100 is added to the pot.

€800 was earned for the pot.

Episode 8 – In één klap 

Contestants are brought to Aeroklub Toužim and are asked to select two candidates to enter a glider plane while the remaining two candidates remain on the ground. One candidate on the ground must communicate three instructions to the candidate on the plane via walkie talkie. While the stunt plane flies, the candidate inside must relay the instructions to the second candidate on the ground, who must follow the instructions – which involve swapping the places of covered puzzle pieces to correctly assemble a puzzle. The two candidates on the ground swap positions once the second candidate enters the plane and the process repeats. If the puzzle is solved by the end of the assignment, €1500 is added to the pot.

No money was earned for the pot.

Contestants enter the Municipal Theatre of Mariánské Lázně (Mariënbad Theater) to find the seats occupied with portraits of former Wie is de Mol candidates. However, the some of the portraits are not in the correct row and must be moved. Upon entry, a series of music videos begins playing in which contestants must decipher clues from the music to correctly determine which portraits belong in each row - the row each song correlates to is mentioned beforehand. For example, the song "You Can Leave Your Hat On" requires row 10 to contain portraits of candidates wearing a hat. For each row with correct portraits, €300 is added to the pot.

€900 was earned for the pot.

Candidates are presented with a wheel which contains prizes or penalties that can be won. One candidate must spin the wheel and another candidate must provide advice on whether or not to take the prize or penalty. The candidate spinning the wheel is not able to see what is shown on the wheel and must rely on the provided advice. The candidate spinning the wheel can accept or reject the prize or penalty that they think they have won. If they reject, they must spin the wheel again. The candidate can reject the advice up to two times and, in that case, they must take whatever they get when they spin the wheel for the third time.

€2,000 was removed from the pot.

Episode 9 – Kaarsrecht 

The group begins at the start of a 6 km trail and must reach the end of the course (Svatoš rocks) to earn €100 for the pot. Along the way there are stations where additional money can be earned by completing an obstacle, or returning along the route to enter a code into a locked box.  Candidates are given a kick scooter to begin with, and along the way there are three dilemmas they would encounter.

At the first dilemma, candidates could trade in their scooters and continue on foot to earn €50 each. At the second dilemma, candidates had to choose between buying a mountain bike for €100 each, or continuing on foot. At the third dilemma, candidates could trade in their mountain bike and continue on foot for the remaining kilometre to the finish line, to earn €100 each.

€1,050 was earned for the pot.

For the final assignment of the season, candidates enter Centrum Caolinum Nevřeň mine to find statements about the Mole’s performance throughout the season. They must individually collect the correct statements, which earn €100 each while the incorrect statements lose €100 each. The statements that the Mole collects are not counted towards the final total. Inside the mine is also a dilemma, where candidates can pay €250 for an envelope with a clue about the Mole; the envelope contains a smaller envelope and a candle.

Episode 10 – Finale 

Notes

Mole sabotage
The following acts of sabotage were revealed at the finale.

: Renée shot Erik, therefore eliminating him from the assignment. She verbally provided incorrect codes for the chests containing money and purposely let herself get shot while holding €250. Throughout the assignment she feigned deafness, requiring other candidates to repeat instructions to her. She also encouraged the group to physically run and look at the lock combinations themselves (as opposed to verbally transferring the combinations), increasing the risk of candidates being shot, as well as losing time.

: Despite hearing the explorers clearly, Renée frequently repeated the information incorrectly, meaning the gatherers often opened incorrect ballerina boxes first which increased their risk of being shot. She also allowed herself to be shot while holding €350, thus losing the money.

: Renée provided the image of two incorrect signs which were subsequently run over.

: Renée avoided giving the complete number of required correct answers for a question, feigning confusion for the final answers required.

: Renée suggested answers/observations she knew were incorrect.

: As the Mole, Renée was told of Charlotte, Marije and Rocky's €5,000 bid. Knowing a substantial amount of money would be lost, she then only bid €1,000 for the advantage to avoid suspicion.

: Renée switched the items inside the locker to ensure the wrong garments were selected and ultimately hoisted. She also lowered the correct garments hoisted by the other candidates during the assignment.

: Despite being given the list of songs beforehand, Renée did not provide any correct guesses. She also mouthed the words of several songs, meaning money would not be earned even if guessed correctly.

: Renée intentionally switched the incorrect puzzle pieces despite correctly hearing the instructions from Rocky. She also switched puzzle pieces that were not instructed to be switched, guaranteeing the failure of the assignment.

: In Renée's first spin, the wheel landed on €2,000. When Rocky revealed to her that outcome benefits the pot, Renée rejected taking the money and elected to spin the wheel again.

Reception

Viewing figures

Controversy
In episode seven, the third assignment involved making the name of a song clear to others via movement and dance. After the episode aired, discussion arose on social media regarding the way contestant Charlotte Nijs attempted to communicate the song "Gangnam Style" by South Korean singer Psy. Nijs was seen performing a 'slanted-eye' gesture while attempting to communicate the song, which fellow candidate Marije Knevel later imitated.

Knevel posted an apology on her social media following the airing of the episode. In response, this particular segment was removed for subsequent airings of the episode and AVROTROS addressed the situation on their social media.

References

External links
 

21
2021 Dutch television seasons
Television shows set in the Czech Republic
Television shows filmed in the Czech Republic